F.N.G. is a compilation album by hardcore/crossover band Suicidal Tendencies.

Track listing

 Although the recording of "Suicyco Mania" is the same one featured on How Will I Laugh Tomorrow When I Can't Even Smile Today, the mix differs in that all vocals sans the title chant are not present - this original version was the b-side to the Trip at the Brain single and was added to CD reissues of the album complete with more conventional verse/chorus vocals.

Suicidal Tendencies albums
1992 compilation albums
Virgin Records compilation albums